Cornelius Eady (born 1954) is an American writer focusing largely on matters of race and society. His poetry often centers on jazz and blues, family life, violence, and societal problems stemming from questions of race and class. His poetry is often praised for its simple and approachable language.

Biography
Cornelius Eady was born in Rochester, New York and is an author of seven volumes of poetry. In most of Eady’s poems, there is a musical quality drawn from the Blues and Jazz.

Recently awarded honors include the Strousse Award from Prairie Schooner, a Lila Wallace-Reader's Digest Award, and individual Fellowships from the Rockefeller Foundation, the John Simon Guggenheim Memorial Foundation, and the National Endowment for the Arts.

Eady has also recently collaborated with jazz composer Deirdre Murray in the production of several works of musical theater, including You Don't Miss Your Water, Running Man, Fangs, and Brutal Imagination. Eady's work also appears in Blackbird: an online journal of literature and the arts.

In 1996, Eady and fellow poet Toi Derricotte founded Cave Canem Foundation, a nonprofit organization for black poets.

Cornelius Eady has taught at Sarah Lawrence College, New York University, The Writer's Voice, The College of William and Mary, University of Notre Dame, and Sweet Briar College. Formerly an associate professor of English and Director of the Poetry Center at State University of New York at Stony Brook and Distinguished Writer-in-Residence at the City College of New York, as well as the Miller Chair in Poetry at University of Missouri. Currently he lives in Knoxville, TN where he serves as the Chair of Excellence at the University of Tennessee-Knoxville. He is married to novelist Sarah Micklem.

Works
His first book of poetry, Kartunes, was published in 1980, with several books of poetry following it.  
He is also the author of Victims of the Latest Dance Craze, which won the 1985 Lamont Poetry Prize of the Academy of American Poets; BOOM, BOOM, BOOM: A Chapbook (1988); The Gathering of My Name; You Don't Miss Your Water; and the autobiography of a jukebox (Carnegie Mellon, 1997).
Cornelius Eady's most recent collection of poetry, Brutal Imagination, was a finalist for the 2001 National Book Award in Poetry.

One of his most popular works, Eady’s book Brutal Imagination (2001) comprises two cycles of poems, each confronting the same subject: the black man in white America. The first cycle, which carries the book’s title, is narrated largely by the "imaginary black man that Susan Smith blamed for kidnapping her two children when in fact she had strapped her babies into the back of their family car and pushed the car into John D. Long Lake and let them drown. It took nine days for the authorities— the FBI and the sheriff— to break her story and so the premise is that for those nine days, that man is alive and walking among us, and it's a big what if:  What if he could talk? What if he had the ability to speak?  What would he have told us?"

The second cycle, "Running Man," focuses on the African-American family and the barriers of color and class. The title character represents every African-American male who has crashed into these barriers.

Bibliography 

 
Victims of the Latest Dance Craze Ommation Press, 1986, ; Carnegie Mellon University Press, 1997,  
BOOM, BOOM, BOOM: A Chapbook, State Street Press, 1988
The Gathering of My Name Carnegie Mellon University Press, 1991,  
You Don't Miss Your Water Henry Holt, 1995, ; Carnegie Mellon University Press, 2004,  
The Autobiography of a Jukebox: Poems Carnegie Mellon Press, 1997; Carnegie Mellon University Press, 2007,  

 The war against the obvious
List of poems

References

External links
Text of Selected Poems
Academy of American Poets Biography
Blackbird: an online journal of literature and the arts
Eady interview on Words on a Wire
Podcast at Badilisha Poetry Exchange
Cornelius Eady Papers. James Weldon Johnson Collection in the Yale Collection of Americaln Literature, Beinecke Rare Book and Manuscript Library.

1954 births
Living people
African-American poets
American academics of English literature
American male non-fiction writers
American male poets
Chapbook writers
City College of New York faculty
National Endowment for the Arts Fellows
The New Yorker people
Sarah Lawrence College faculty
21st-century African-American people
20th-century African-American people